Jaime Villena Gascó (19 April 1897 - 28 March 1975), was a Spanish footballer who played as a forward for FC Espanya. He spent all 13 seasons of his playing career with FC Espanya, thus being a historical member of the club and part of the so-called one-club men group. He was also a referee in the late 1920s.

Club career
Born in Catalonia, he began his career at his hometown club FC Espanya in 1913, aged just 16, and despite his young age, he quickly became one of the club's most important players. In his first season with them, Villena helped them win the 1913–14 Catalan championship, the 1914 Pyrenees Cup and then helped the club reach their first (and only) Copa del Rey final in 1914, but they failed to complete the treble with a 1–2 loss to Athletic Bilbao, in a game in which Villena scored Espanya's consolation goal in the 88th minute. He also was pivotal in helping the club win the 1916–17 Catalan championship. Villena played with the club for more than a decade until his retirement in 1926 at the age of 29.

Referee career
Villena became a referee in the late 1920s, shortly after his retirement. He was a referee in the very first Spanish league in 1928.

Honours

Club
FC Espanya
Catalan championship:
Champions (3): 1912–13, 1913–14 and 1916–17

Copa del Rey:
Runner-up (1): 1914

Pyrenees Cup:
Champions (1): 1914

References

1897 births
1975 deaths
Spanish footballers
Association football forwards
Footballers from Catalonia
RCD Espanyol footballers